József Tunyogi (9 March 1907 - 11 April 1980) was born in Budapest, Hungary and was a Hungarian wrestler.

He won the European Greco-Roman wrestling championship in 1929 and the European freestyle wrestling in 1931.

1932 games
The following year he was selected by Hungary for the 1932 Summer Olympics in Los Angeles, United States at the age of 25. In the first round (1 August) he defeated Émile Poilvé of France, followed by Robert Hess of the USA the next day.

In the third round he defeated Sumiyuki Kutani of Japan, on the same day as he defeated Hess. All three of his victories were by decision.

In the final round, however, he was beaten by Kyösti Luukko of Finland, knocked out after 7 minutes, 29 seconds. Luukko then went on to win the silver medal.

He died in 1980 in Iváncsa, Hungary.

See also
 Hungary at the 1932 Summer Olympics

References
 József Tunyogi biography

1907 births
1980 deaths
Olympic wrestlers of Hungary
Olympic bronze medalists for Hungary
Martial artists from Budapest
Hungarian wrestlers
Wrestlers at the 1932 Summer Olympics
Hungarian male sport wrestlers
Olympic medalists in wrestling
Medalists at the 1932 Summer Olympics
20th-century Hungarian people